Dafallah Sultan Farah (born 1949) is a Sudanese sprinter. He competed in the men's 4 × 400 metres relay at the 1972 Summer Olympics.

References

1946 births
Living people
Athletes (track and field) at the 1972 Summer Olympics
Sudanese male sprinters
Sudanese male middle-distance runners
Olympic athletes of Sudan
Place of birth missing (living people)